Difference of Opinion was an Australian television program produced and broadcast by ABC1. It began at the start of 2007, hosted, jointly, by ex-60 Minutes journalist Jeff McMullen and Warren Brown. It was a debating program.

In 2008, the program was in some ways replaced by the similar ABC1 program Q&A.

External links
 Official website
 

2007 Australian television series debuts

sv:Difference Of Opinion